The Opera Tower is a residential skyscraper in Miami, Florida, United States.  It was developed by Tibor Hollo's Florida East Coast Realty, and was completed in late 2007.  The Opera Tower received its temporary certificate of occupancy on December 26, 2007.  The 55-story tower is located at 1750 North Bayshore Drive in Miami's Arts & Entertainment District, just north of Downtown Miami. The building contains 635 uniquely designed luxury condominiums. It is also home to the Japanese-inspired sushi restaurant, NoVe Kitchen and Bar (now closed).

See also
List of tallest buildings in Miami
 List of tallest buildings in Florida

Gallery

References

Residential buildings completed in 2007
Residential skyscrapers in Miami
2007 establishments in Florida